Bicknacre is a village in the civil parish of Woodham Ferrers and Bicknacre, in the county of Essex, England. The village is in the borough of Chelmsford and in the parliamentary constituency of Maldon & East Chelmsford. In 2018 it had an estimated population of 2263.

Priory arch 

There was a hermitage on this site until around the end of 1154, when it was converted into a priory for the Augustinian Canons, also known as the Black Canons. It was known as Wodeham (Woodham) Priory until 1235 when the name Bicknacre first occurs.

The arch is all that remains of the priory. It comprises the west arch of the crossing of the church (estimated to date from about 1250) with attached fragments of the nave and north transept. The arch and the surrounding fields, known as Priory Fields, are looked after by a voluntary group, called Friends of Priory Fields.

Landmarks 
The St Giles Home for British Lepers no longer exists, but St. Giles Churchyard, which is marked as an Essex Wildlife Trust Nature Reserve is in Moor Hall Lane. It is rumoured that the church is haunted by a man buried in the graveyard. His name remains unknown.

Notable people
Notable people from the village include; Richard Robarts, a former Formula One driver, and the artist Daniel West. The artist Grayson Perry lived in the village for part of his childhood. Joe Pettit, writer of the multi-award winning short film Yout also lived in Bicknacre.

Images

References

External links

 Friends of Priory Fields

Villages in Essex